Hayleys PLC, founded in 1878, is a multinational and diversified conglomerate company in Sri Lanka with business spanning over 16 sectors, catering to 70 markets worldwide. Hayleys accounts for approximately 4.2% of Sri Lanka's export income, and 3.9% of the country's tea and 4.5% of its rubber production. With over 30,000 employees, Hayley was also the first listed entity in the country to surpass annual revenue of US$1 billion in Fiscal Year 2017/18. The company operates over 16 business sectors: eco-solutions, hand protection, purification, agriculture, consumer and retail, leisure, textile manufacturing, construction materials, plantations, industrial solutions, power and energy, transportation and logistics, BPO, tea exports, projects and engineering, and investments and services. Hayleys comprises over 130 business units and subsidiaries, nine of which are publicly listed in the Colombo Stock Exchange. In addition to Sri Lanka, Hayleys today has manufacturing facilities in Indonesia and Thailand and marketing operations in Australia, India, Bangladesh, Italy, Japan, Netherlands, UK and USA and its products are sold in 80 countries.

History

Early Years 
The beginnings of the Hayleys Group can be traced back to 1871 when Charles Pickering Hayley (1848–1934), the son of British businessman, Thomas Hayley (1807–1881), disembarked from the Percy Douglas, a 781-tonne clipper ship (owned by Thomas Hayley), at Galle, Ceylon. The ship subsequently was wrecked off the coast of Rangoon.

Hayley joined a firm of shipping agents, Thomson Mitchell & Co, in 1874. When the company closed three years later due to bad investments, he rented a shop on Pedlar Street in Galle Fort and started his own import/export company, Chas. P. Hayley & Co., on 10 January 1878, exporting local products including coir, cinnamon and citronella oil and importing goods such as British claret. Hayley married Gertrude Fanny Lee (1849–1911), the daughter of George Lee, the Postmaster General of Ceylon (1844–1860) and Martha née Austin. The couple had six children and in 1893 his oldest son, Alec (1875–1936), joined the firm, followed by another son, Stuart Pickering (1883–1960), eight years later.

In 1909, he entered into a partnership with W. W. Kenny to purchase Thurburn Stores, at Deans Road.

Hayley and Kenny became a Private Limited Company in 1935 and Chas P. Hayley & Co. becomes a private limited liability company and fully owned subsidiary of Hayley and Kenny Ltd. in 1944. In 1954 under one corporate umbrella, the entity went public. Hayleys Ltd continued to diversify into a portfolio that currently includes activated carbon, rubber gloves, textiles, fibre-based products, tea and rubber plantations, leisure, transportation and logistics services, consumer products, and other investments and services to name just a few.

2000-Present 
Hayleys steps into power generation in collaboration with AES corporation of USA in 2001.

Hayleys entered the ship-owning business in 2003 with a maiden investment in the container vessel "Orient Stride". 2003 also saw the first overseas plant setup by Dipped Products Ltd.

2006 saw Hayleys adopt a new visual identity, replacing its former logo of 50 years.

In 2008, Hayleys became one of the 10 signatories for the CEO Water Mandate initiative of the UN's Global Compact. It was also in 2008 that Dhammika Perera acquired the controlling stake in Hayleys.

Hayleys continued to grow and expand through the decades with a series of strategic acquisitions, such as the acquisition of the Ceylon Continental Hotel in Colombo in 2010 (which at the time was the single largest investment in its history), and that of Alumex Group and Amaya Leisure PLC in 2011. The Ceylon Continental Hotel was rebranded and unveiled as The Kingsbury Hotel in 2012.

Hayleys also made forays into the renewable energy industry from 2013 onwards, through its wind power, hydropower and solar power plants located in advantageous locations in Sri Lanka.

The Advantis Free Zone was opened for operations in 2015.

In 2016, Hayleys acquired a 75% controlling stake in Fentons Group (subsequently rebranded as Hayleys Fentons) and purchased the Kuda Rah Resort in the Maldives (which became Amaya Kuda Rah).

In 2017, Hayleys acquired 61.73% of the equity in Singer (Sri Lanka) PLC (the single largest acquisition for a listed company in Sri Lanka in recent times), as well as the majority stake in Sri Lanka Shipping Company Limited, a leading shipping and maritime organization, making Advantis the largest vessel operator.

Hayleys celebrated "140 years of excellence" in 2018.

In 2018, Hayleys entered into a strategic partnership with Martin Bauer group of Germany, renaming Hayleys Global Beverages as Martin Bauer Hayleys with the joint venture investment by MB Beteligungs GmbH.

In April 2021, Hayleys Fabric acquired a 98.84% stake in South Asia Textiles Limited as part of its strategic plan to export value-added fabrics.

Hayleys and its associates have forged successful partnerships with Mercedes-Benz, TATA International, Dystar, Symrise, Bayer Cropscience, Philips Lighting, Polymer Latex, Volvo, Fujifilm, P&G, Shimadzu, FedEx and Gillette.

Corporate affairs 
Hayleys is a Sri Lankan diversified conglomerate headquartered in Colombo, Sri Lanka. Its main offices are located in and around the premises; however other manufacturing, agricultural, marketing, and production bases are geographically spread around the country and throughout five different continents.

Hayleys PLC, the Group's holding company, has an AA-(Ika) by Fitch and a market capitalisation of 1.08%. However, the composition of the entire Group includes 8 other publicly listed companies. The blue-chip recorded its highest profits in the twelve months ending 31 March 2010 and made its single largest investment in its 130-plus year history – the buying over of the five-star Ceylon Continental Hotel in Colombo, Sri Lanka which is now known as The Kingsbury. In 2010, the Ceylon Chamber of Commerce ranked Hayleys as the country's best corporate citizen, based on an analysis of several factors of CSR and sustainability, implemented throughout the public and private spheres.

Corporate recognition 
In 2010, Hayleys Group was named Sri Lanka's Best Corporate Citizen by the Ceylon Chamber of Commerce.

The firm brought fame and recognition to the country by winning a European Foundation for Management Development Award for the INSEAD-produced case study featuring the company, and winning the USAID Global Development Alliance Award for Sri Lanka for fostering commercial agriculture in Sri Lanka's Eastern Province.

In 2012, the Hayleys Group was ranked amongst the top three most respected business entities in Sri Lanka and placed first for Nation-Mindedness in Lanka Monthly Digest's ‘Most Respected Entities In Sri Lanka’ survey, the Group's best standing since 2008.

In 2021, Hayleys PLC was ranked the No.1 company in the LMD's Top 100 listed companies of Sri Lanka (for the fifth consecutive time) and the Business Today Top 40.

References

External links 
 Official website

Companies established in 1878
Companies listed on the Colombo Stock Exchange
Conglomerate companies of Sri Lanka
1878 establishments in Ceylon
Manufacturing companies based in Colombo